Llangorse Mountain is a mountain in northern British Columbia, Canada, located  southeast of Atlin on the eastern side of the head of the Gladys River. It is a volcanic feature of the vast Northern Cordilleran Volcanic Province and is the only location of megacrysts made of kaersutite in the volcanic zone.

Llangorse Mountain got its name origin on October 7, 1954 from being near Llangorse Lake, which gets its name from Llangorse Lake, the largest lake in South Wales, which is in turn named for the nearby village of Llangors.

See also
 Volcanism of Canada
 Volcanism of Western Canada
 List of Northern Cordilleran volcanoes

References

Volcanoes of British Columbia
One-thousanders of British Columbia
Cassiar Land District